Gabriele Basilico (12 August 1944 – 13 February 2013) was an Italian photographer who defined himself as "a measurer of space".

Born in Milan, Italy in 1944, he originally studied to become an architect before pursuing a career in photography. His initial works focused around traditional landscape photography, but he later shifted his focus to architectural photography due to the influence of his previous studies in architecture. He achieved international fame in 1982 with his photographic report on the industrial areas of Milan, "Ritratti di Fabbriche, Sugarco".

In the mid-1980s he was part of a group of photographers commissioned by the French Government to document the transformation of the Transalpine landscape.

In 1991 his photographs helped to document the effects of war on the Lebanese capital of Beirut with his celebrated work, "Beirut 1991".

His last public work was showcased in December 2012,  at the inauguration of a new square, Gae Aulenti, in Milan. The work consisted of a series of photographs that portrayed the Porta Nuova Project from its inception through completion.

The majority of Basilico's work was done using a traditional viewfinder camera and black and white film. He was awarded the Osella d'Oro  at the 1996 Venice Biennale.

References

1944 births
2013 deaths
Photographers from Milan
Italian photographers
20th-century Italian photographers
21st-century Italian photographers